The Djibouti women's national under-20 football team represents Djibouti in international youth women's football competitions.

The team finished in 6th place in the first edition of the CECAFA Women's U-20 Championship.

See also 
 Djibouti women's national football team

References 

under-20
African women's national under-20 association football teams